Mad, Mad 83 (Feng kuang ba san) is a 1983 Hong Kong Shaw Brothers comedy film directed by Chor Yuen. It is the debut film of actor Tony Leung Chiu-wai. The film grossed HK $5,301,780 at the box office.

References

External links
 

1983 films
Hong Kong comedy films
1983 comedy films
Shaw Brothers Studio films
Films directed by Chor Yuen
1980s Hong Kong films